Fariha Fatima al-Jerrahi (born Philippa de Menil; 13 June 1947) is the spiritual guide and current Sheikha of the Nur Ashki Jerrahi Sufi Order in New York City.

Biography

She was born in 1947 into a socially committed, eclectic French Catholic family in Houston, Texas. At the age of 29, she met her mentor and guide on the path of Sufism upon his first visit to the Americas, Sheikh Muzaffer Özak Âșkî al-Jerrahi of Istanbul. She received direct transmission from him in 1980. Sheikh Muzaffer also gave direct transmission to fellow American dervish Sheikh Nur al-Anwar al-Jerrahi, who envisioned a radical and illumined path of the heart which he called Universal Islam. After Sheikh Nur's passing, she would take on the guidance of the Nur Ashki Jerrahi Sufi Order and it's circles of dervishes around the world. 

Sheikha Fariha al-Jerrahi leads devotional prayers, ceremonies of divine remembrance, and provides spiritual guidance to initiates from her seat at the Dergah al-Farah in downtown Manhattan. While fostering bonds with the greater Sufi & Muslim American communities, the role of women in Islam and spiritual ecology have been of special importance to her message.

See also
Muzaffer Ozak
Lex Hixon
Nur Ashki Jerrahi Sufi Order
Jerrahi Sufi Order
Dia Art Foundation

References

External links
 Nur Ashki Jerrahi Sufi Order

American people of French descent
American religious leaders
American spiritual teachers
American Sufis
Clergy from New York City
Converts to Islam
Female Islamic religious leaders
People from Houston
Religious leaders from New York (state)
Religious leaders from Texas
Sufi religious leaders
Sufi teachers
1947 births
Living people